Hilmar Bading (born 1958) is a German physician and neuroscientist. He is a member of the German National Academy of Science Leopoldina.

Education and career 
Hilmar Bading studied medicine from 1978 to 1984 at Heidelberg University (MD in 1984) and carried out his MD Thesis at the Max Planck Institute for Medical Research, Heidelberg on calcium transport ATPase in skeletal muscle. He received postdoctoral training at the Max Planck Institute for Molecular Genetics, Berlin, Germany (1985–1989) and at Harvard Medical School, Boston, US (1989–1993). From 1993 to 2001 he was a staff scientist at the MRC Laboratory of Molecular Biology, Cambridge, UK. Since 2001 he has been professor of neurobiology and director of the Neurobiology Institute and the Interdisciplinary Center for Neurosciences (IZN) at Heidelberg University.

He is co-founder of FundaMental Pharma GmbH, Heidelberg.

He founded the Foundation BrainAid.

Research 
Hilmar Bading's work is focused on neuronal calcium signaling and gene regulation in the nervous system. He identified calcium as the principal second messenger in the coupling of neuronal activity to gene expression and characterized the processes that mediate the dialogue between the synapse and the nucleus. His work highlighted the spatial aspects of calcium signals and in particular the importance of nuclear calcium in governing activity-dependent gene expression and adaptations in the nervous system that include memory formation and acquired neuroprotection. The discovery of toxic signaling by extrasynaptic NMDA receptors which antagonizes gene regulation by synaptic activity and causes neuronal dysfunction and cell death contributed to the understanding of neurodegenerative disorders including Huntington's disease, Alzheimer's disease, and amyotrophic lateral sclerosis (ALS).

Hilmar Bading and his co-workers uncovered the importance of a death signaling complex consisting of extrasynaptic NMDA receptors (NMDARs) and TRPM4 for excitotoxicity and identified a class of neuroprotective small molecules (known as NMDAR/TRPM4 interaction interface inhibitors or short ‚interface inhibitors‘) that disrupt the NMDAR/TRPM4 complex and protect against cell death in mouse models of stroke and retinal ganglion cell degeneration.

Awards and honors 
2001: Wolfgang-Paul Prize of the Alexander von Humboldt Foundation

2016: Innovation Prize of the German BioRegions

2019: Elected to the German National Academy of Science Leopoldina

References 

German neuroscientists
Scientists from Berlin
Academic staff of Heidelberg University
Heidelberg University alumni
1958 births
Living people